The Bodil Award for Best Non-American Film is one of the categories for the Bodil Awards presented annually by the Danish Union of Film Critics (Danish: Filmedarbejderforeningen). It was created in 1948 and is one of the oldest film prizes in Europe. This category was called "Best European Film" until 2001, when it became the "Best Non-American Film".

Honorees

1940s 
 1948: A Matter of Life and Death directed by Michael Powell and Emeric Pressburger
 1949: Hamlet directed by Laurence Olivier

1950s 
 1950: The Third Man directed by Carol Reed
 1951: Bicycle Thieves directed by Vittorio De Sica
 1952: The Browning Version directed by Anthony Asquith
 1953: Only a Mother directed by Alf Sjöberg
 1954: Forbidden Games directed by René Clément
 1955: Umberto D. directed by Vittorio De Sica
 1956: La Strada directed by Federico Fellini
 1957: Smiles of a Summer Night directed by Ingmar Bergman
 1958: Gates of Paris directed by René Clair
 1959: Wild Strawberries directed by Ingmar Bergman

1960s 
 1960: 400 Blows directed by François Truffaut
 1961: Ballad of a Soldier directed by Grigory Chukhray
 1962: Rocco and His Brothers directed by Luchino Visconti
 1963: Jules and Jim directed by François Truffaut
 1964: 8½ directed by Federico Fellini and Dr. Strangelove directed by Stanley Kubrick
 1965: The Soft Skin directed by François Truffaut
 1966: The Rules of the Game directed by Jean Renoir
 1967: Loves of a Blonde directed by Miloš Forman
 1968: Belle de Jour directed by Luis Buñuel
 1969: Playtime directed by Jacques Tati

1970s 
 1970: Adalen Riots directed by Bo Widerberg
 1971: Le Boucher directed by Claude Chabrol
 1972: Death in Venice directed by Luchino Visconti
 1973: The New Land directed by Jan Troell
 1974: Cries and Whispers directed by Ingmar Bergman
 1975: Amarcord directed by Federico Fellini
 1976: The Passenger directed by Michelangelo Antonioni
 1977: 1900 directed by Bernardo Bertolucci
 1978: Providence directed by Alain Resnais
 1979: Autumn Sonata directed by Ingmar Bergman

1980s 
 1980: The Tin Drum directed by Volker Schlöndorff
 1981: Max Havelaar directed by Fons Rademakers
 1982: The French Lieutenant's Woman directed by Karel Reisz
 1983: The Simple-Minded Murderer directed by Hans Alfredson
 1984: Carmen directed by Carlos Saura
 1985: Paris, Texas directed by Wim Wenders
 1986: Ran directed by Akira Kurosawa
 1987: My Life as a Dog directed by Lasse Hallström
 1988: Round Midnight directed by Bertrand Tavernier
 1989: Au revoir les enfants directed by Louis Malle

1990s 
 1990: A Short Film About Killing directed by Krzysztof Kieślowski
 1991: Dekalog directed by Krzysztof Kieślowski
 1992: Life Is Sweet directed by Mike Leigh
 1993: Howards End directed by James Ivory
 1994: Not awarded
 1995: Three Colours: Red directed by Krzysztof Kieślowski
 1996: Lamerica directed by Gianni Amelio
 1997: Trainspotting directed by Danny Boyle
 1998: The Full Monty directed by Peter Cattaneo
 1999: My Name Is Joe directed by Ken Loach

2000s 
 2000: All About My Mother directed by Pedro Almodóvar
 2001: Crouching Tiger, Hidden Dragon directed by Ang Lee
 2002: Songs from the Second Floor directed by Roy Andersson
 2003: Talk to Her directed by Pedro Almodóvar
 2004: Good Bye, Lenin! directed by Wolfgang Becker
 2005: Look at Me directed by Agnès Jaoui
 2006: Downfall directed by Oliver Hirschbiegel
 2007: The Lives of Others directed by Florian Henckel von Donnersmarck
 2008: Pan's Labyrinth directed by Guillermo del Toro
 2009: Let the Right One In directed by Tomas Alfredson

2010s 
 2010: Waltz with Bashir directed by Ari Folman
 2011: The White Ribbon directed by Michael Haneke
 2012: A Separation directed by Asghar Farhadi
 2013: Amour directed by Michael Haneke
 2014: Blue Is the Warmest Colour directed by Abdellatif Kechiche
 2015: Force Majeure directed by Ruben Östlund
 2016: Mommy directed by Xavier Dolan
 2017: Toni Erdmann directed by Maren Ade
 2018: The Square directed by Ruben Östlund
 2019: Roma directed by Alfonso Cuarón

2020s 
 2020: Parasite directed by Bong Joon-ho
 2021: Portrait of a Lady on Fire directed by Céline Sciamma

See also 

 Robert Award for Best Non-American Film

References

Sources

Further reading

External links 
  

1948 establishments in Denmark
Awards established in 1948
Awards for best film
Non-American
Lists of films by award